The 1973 Kilkenny Intermediate Hurling Championship was the ninth staging of the Kilkenny Intermediate Hurling Championship since its establishment by the Kilkenny County Board. The draw for the opening round fixtures took place on 9 April 1973. The championship began on 6 May 1973 and ended on 11 November 1973.

The final was played on 11 November 1973 at Nowlan Park in Kilkenny, between Coon and Graignamanagh, in what was their first meeting in a final. Coon won the match by 4-08 to 3-06 to claim their first championship title.

Team summaries

Results

Semi-finals

Final

References

External links
 Kilkenny GAA website

Kilkenny Intermediate Hurling Championship
Kilkenny Intermediate Hurling Championship